Patrick James Donahue II (born December 24, 1957) is a United States Army lieutenant general who served as deputy commander, United States Army Forces Command (FORSCOM).

Donahue was born in Hawaii on December 24, 1957. His father, Robert J. Donahue was a lieutenant general in the United States Army. He graduated from the United States Military Academy and was commissioned as an infantry officer in the Regular Army in 1980. His military education includes the Infantry Officer Basic and Advanced Courses, Ranger School, United States Air Command and Staff College, and the United States Army War College. He was an Olmsted Scholar and studied at the University of Innsbruck, Austria. He holds a Masters in Public Administration from Harvard University, and a Masters of Strategic Studies from the Army War College. Lt. Gen. Donahue commanded airborne and air assault units at the company, battalion, brigade levels, and most recently a theater Army.

Donahue was previously the Commanding General, United States Army Africa, Vicenza, Italy. He also served as the Deputy Chief of Staff, U.S. Army Training and Doctrine Command, Joint Base Langley-Eustis, Virginia, Deputy Commanding General (Maneuver), 3rd Infantry Division, Fort Stewart, Georgia and U.S. Division North-Iraq from 2008-2010; Commander, 1st Brigade, 82nd Airborne Division from 2003-2006 and commanded the brigade combat team on two deployments to Afghanistan and one to Iraq; Commander, Operations Group Bravo, U.S. Army Battle Command Training Program/Chief of Future Operations, V Corps from 2002-2003 for the initial Iraq invasion; and Assistant Chief of Staff, G3 and Commander, 1st Battalion 506th Infantry Regiment (Air Assault), 2nd Infantry Division, Republic of Korea from 1998–2001.

Awards and decorations

References

1957 births
Living people
United States Army generals
Harvard Kennedy School alumni